Augulaspidina is a subtribe of armored scale insects. It was not confirmed by Takagi's 2002 study.

Genera
Asymetraspis MacGillivray, 1921 originally Asymmetraspis
Augulaspis MacGillivray, 1921
Dentachionaspis MacGillivray, 1921
Getulaspis Balachowsky, 1954
Mammata Munting, 1969
Moraspis Hall, 1946
Rolaspis Hall, 1946
Salaspis Hall, 1946
Tecaspis Hall, 1946
Versiculaspis MacGillivray, 1921
Voraspis Hall, 1946
Yomaspis Munting, 1968
Yuanaspis Young, 1986

References

Insect subtribes
Diaspidini